The Headquarters & Headquarters Service Group, known officially as HHSG, is one of the units of the 1st Technical and Administrative Services Brigade (Reserve) of the AFP Reserve Command, and is based in Quezon City. The unit provides combat support and service support services for the 1TAS Brigade.

The Headquarters & Headquarters Service Group is a base unit and is in charge of base administration and service support for the 1st TAS Brigade.

References

Military units and formations of the Philippine Army
Reserve and Auxiliary Units of the Philippine Military